The following lists events that happened during 1998 in Laos.

Incumbents
President: Nouhak Phoumsavanh (until 24 February), Khamtai Siphandon (starting 24 February)
Vice President: Sisavath Keobounphanh (until 24 February), Oudom Khattigna (starting 24 February)
Prime Minister: Khamtai Siphandon (until 24 February), Sisavath Keobounphanh (starting 24 February)

Events
date unknown - 1998 Lao League

References

 
Years of the 20th century in Laos
Laos
1990s in Laos
Laos